Lacertaspis rohdei, also known as the Gabon lidless skink or Gaboon lidless skink, is a species of lizard in the family Scincidae. It is named after Reinhold Theodor Rohde, Australian missionary.

Lacertaspis rohdei is endemic to Central Africa and is known from Cameroon, Equatorial Guinea, Gabon, and the Republic of the Congo. It occurs in leaf litter in lowland and montane forests.

References

Lacertaspis
Skinks of Africa
Reptiles of Cameroon
Reptiles of Equatorial Guinea
Reptiles of Gabon
Reptiles of the Republic of the Congo
Reptiles described in 1910
Taxa named by Lorenz Müller